North Arm is a rural town and locality in the Sunshine Coast Region, Queensland, Australia.

Geography
North Arm is in the Sunshine Coast hinterland. It takes its name from the North Maroochy River which flows through it.
The Bruce Highway passes through the locality and town from south to north. The North Coast railway line runs beside and east of the highway with the town being served by North Arm railway station.

History 
The name North Arm refers to the district's proximity to the northern branch of the Maroochy River.

Fairhill Provisional School opened on 27 July 1885. On 1 January 1909 it became Fairhill State School. In October 1915 it was renamed North Arm State School.

In 1914, the North Arm Hall opened and remained a hub of community social life for 40 years, until it was destroyed by a cyclone in 1954 and was later rebuilt.

Brown's Creek State School opened on 29 January 1918 and closed on 23 August 1936. This school was located on the south side of King Creek near its junction with Browns Creek, in the locality currently called Eerwah Vale. 

Golden Valley State School opened on 27 August 1918. On 1 July 1940 it was renamed Valdora State School. In 1949 the school building was moved and renamed Yandina Creek State School. It closed on 7 August 1964.

In the  the locality of North Arm had a population of 657 people.

Amenities
North Arm has a forest reserve on the outskirts of town.

Education 
North Arm State School is a government primary (Prep-6) school for boys and girls at Cnr Fairhill & Yandina Creek Road. In 2018, the school had an enrolment of 351 students with 30 teachers (24 full-time equivalent) and 23 non-teaching staff (12 full-time equivalent).

References

Further reading

External links 
 
 

Suburbs of the Sunshine Coast Region
Localities in Queensland